The 1987–88 Illinois State Redbirds men's basketball team represented Illinois State University during the 1987–88 NCAA Division I men's basketball season. The Redbirds, led by tenth year head coach Bob Donewald, played their home games at Horton Field House and were a member of the Missouri Valley Conference.

The Redbirds finished the season 18–13, 9–5 in conference play to finish in third place. They were the number three seed in the Missouri Valley Conference tournament. They were victorious in a quarterfinal game versus Drake University and in a semifinal game versus Wichita State University, but defeated beaten in the final game versus Bradley University.

The Redbirds received an at-large bid to the 1988 National Invitation Tournament. They lost to Cleveland State University in the first round.

Roster

Schedule

|-
!colspan=9 style=|Exhibition Season

|-
!colspan=9 style=|Regular Season

|-
!colspan=9 style=|Missouri Valley Conference {MVC} tournament

|-
!colspan=9 style=|National Invitation {NIT} tournament

References

Illinois State Redbirds men's basketball seasons
Illinois State
Illinois State